The 1940 All-Ireland Senior Hurling Championship Final was a hurling match played at Croke Park on 1 September 1940 to determine the winners of the 1940 All-Ireland Senior Hurling Championship, a tournament organised by the Gaelic Athletic Association for the champions of the three hurling provinces of Ireland. It was the 53rd All-Ireland final. The match was contested by Kilkenny of Leinster and Limerick of Munster, with Limerick winning by 3–7 to 1–7.

The All-Ireland final between Limerick and Kilkenny was the fifth championship meeting between the two teams. Kilkenny, the reigning champions, were appearing in their eighth final in ten years and were hoping to win their 13th title. Limerick were lining out in their fifth final in eight years and were hoping to claim a 6th championship title.

Limerick's All-Ireland victory was their first since 1936. The win put them in joint fourth position, alongside Dublin on the all-time roll of honour.

Kilkenny's All-Ireland defeat was their tenth in a final. It was the first of three defeats in All-Ireland final before their next victory.

Match

Details

References

1
All-Ireland Senior Hurling Championship Finals
Kilkenny GAA matches
Limerick GAA matches
All-Ireland Senior Hurling Championship Final
All-Ireland Senior Hurling Championship Final
All-Ireland Senior Hurling Championship Final, 1940